Naomi Tinanimotea Waqanidrola (born 9 July 1993) is a Fijian footballer who plays as a defender for Rewa FC and the Fiji women's national team. She is the sister of Sekola Waqanidrola.

Waqanidrola is vice-president of the Rewa Football Association and coaches the Rewa women's football team. In 2022 she was assistant coach of the national women's team.

In 2021 she was appointed a football ambassador by the Oceania Football Confederation as part of its women's football strategy.

Notes

References

1993 births
Living people
Women's association football defenders
Fijian women's footballers
Fiji women's international footballers